Walther Hewel (25 March 1904 – 2 May 1945) was a German diplomat before and during World War II, an early and active member of the Nazi Party, and one of German dictator Adolf Hitler's personal friends.

Early life
Hewel was born in 1904 to Anton and Elsa Hewel in Cologne in the Rhineland, where his father ran a cocoa factory. His father died in 1913, leaving Elsa to run the factory.

Hewel graduated in 1923, moved to Munich in Bavaria, and attended the Technical University of Munich. The same year, as an 18 year old, he joined the Stosstrupp Hitler, a formation of the Nazi Party's SA "brownshirt" stormtroopers  – his member number was in the low 200s – and took part in Hitler's failed Beer Hall Putsch, carrying a swastika banner with 23-year-old Heinrich Himmler. After Hitler's subsequent conviction for treason, Hewel was in Landsberg prison with him for several months, where he served as Hitler's volunteer valet.  He was released on 30 December 1924 because of his youth.

Hewel then served a commercial apprenticeship in Hamburg in 1926, following which he spent a year in England.  From 1927, Hewel worked abroad for several years in the Dutch East Indies (now Indonesia) as a planter and coffee salesman for a British firm . Hewel joined the Nazi Party there in June 1933 and helped to organise local branches with German expatriates as members. By 1937, the Nazi Party in Indonesia had established branches in Batavia, Bandung, Semarang, Surabaya, Medan, Padang, and Makassar.

In Nazi Germany
In March 1936, Hewel returned to Germany, where he was appointed the Chief of the East Asia Desk in the Foreign Section of the Party.  He entered Germany's diplomatic service and was sent to Spain. Journalist James P. O'Donnell remarked that, during this time, Hewel "was almost certainly an agent of Admiral Wilhelm Canaris's Abwehr" counter-intelligence agency.

Hewel returned to Germany, and in 1937 became the Chief of the English Desk in Foreign Minister Joachim von Ribbentrop's office, and in 1938 the head of Ribbentrop's personal staff. On 15 March 1939, he transcribed the conference between Hitler and Czech president Emil Hácha.

Hewel was promoted to SS-Sturmbannführer on 12 July 1937, and Brigadeführer on 9 November 1942.

During World War II
Hewel was then appointed, in 1940, to the position of "Special Ambassador" and was Ribbentrop's direct liaison with Hitler.  During this time, he resumed his earlier friendship with the dictator. He spent most of World War II without an official portfolio and once described himself as "an ambassador to nowhere".  In the later years of the war, as Hitler became more estranged from Ribbentrop, Hewel acted as Hitler's senior adviser on foreign policy matters and a member of Hitler's inner circle.  When Hitler moved from his "Wolf's Lair" headquarters in East Prussia to the Führerbunker under the garden of the Reich Chancellery in Berlin, Hewel joined him there with the rest of Hitler's entourage.

Survivors of Hitler's inner circle claimed that Hewel owed his position to his long involvement with the Nazi Party, and because he was one of Hitler's friends. In her memoirs, Traudl Junge, Hitler's private secretary, described Hewel as something like Hitler's majordomo. According to Junge, Hewel was placed in charge of coordinating his household, keeping peace between the military and civilian officials around Hitler, and regulating contact between male and female members of Hitler's entourage.

Hewel – along with Propaganda Minister Joseph Goebbels; Hitler's personal secretary, Martin Bormann; Artur Axmann, the head of the Hitler Youth; Johann Rattenhuber, an SS General who was head of the Reichssicherheitsdienst (RSD) which protected Hitler; Ludwig Stumpfegger, Hitler's personal surgeon; and Otto Günsche, Hitler's personal adjutant – was one of the residents of the bunker to observe the burning of the bodies of Adolf Hitler and Eva Braun after they committed suicide.  Along with all the others, he had been briefed by Hitler as to what to do to destroy the bodies, although this task was not properly carried out.  Earlier, Hewel had been one of the attendees at the wedding between Hitler and Braun, and then the final goodbyes from Hitler and Braun before their suicides.

Death
Until Hitler committed suicide on 30 April 1945, Hewel remained in his inner circle. As one of the few people to remain near him until the end, he was said to have tried to cheer Hitler up.  He was among the last people to have a personal conversation with Hitler before he died, in which Hitler had encouraged Hewel to commit suicide. Hitler warned Hewel that if he was captured by the Red Army, he would be tortured and "mounted in a waxworks". Hitler gave Hewel a cyanide capsule and a Walther 7.65 handgun, then had him take an oath to kill himself rather than be captured by the Soviets.

Following Hitler's suicide, Hewel escaped the Führerbunker in a group led by SS-Brigadeführer Wilhelm Mohnke. Mohnke planned to break out towards the German Army, which was positioned in Prinzenallee. However, Hewel was apparently suffering from psychological stress at the time. In her memoirs, Traudl Junge, one of Hitler's secretaries, claimed that, after Hitler's death, Hewel appeared extremely confused and unable to make the simplest decisions for himself. 

The group headed along the U-Bahn tunnels, but their route was blocked so they went above ground and later joined hundreds of other German civilians and military personnel who had sought refuge at the Schultheiss-Patzenhofer Brewery. Upon arriving at the holdout on 2 May 1945, Hewel made remarks to the effect that he planned to commit suicide. Despite the efforts of Dr. Ernst-Günther Schenck – who attempted to talk him out of it in a long and wide-ranging conversation – Hewel killed himself in the manner that Professor Dr. Werner Haase had recommended to Hitler, biting down on a cyanide capsule while shooting himself in the head. According to Schenck, Hewel was emotionally and physically exhausted, which contributed to his actions.

In his long conversation with Schenck, Hewel said about Hitler, in response to Schenck's question about Hitler's mental health in his last days:

Personality and personal life
When Gretl Braun, the sister of Hitler's mistress Eva Braun, became pregnant out of wedlock, Hitler took steps to try to find her a husband.  Hewel, a shy bachelor, was considered to be one of the possibilities.  Braun later married SS-Gruppenführer Hermann Fegelein of the Waffen-SS. A few weeks later, on 12 July 1944, Fegelein's good friend, Elizabeth "Blondie" Blanda – a Red Cross nurse who had previously tended to Hewel after he survived an airplane crash on 21 April 1944 in which General Hans-Valentin Hube was killed – married Hewel at Berchtesgaden.

The tall and portly Hewel, whose nickname was "Surabaya Wally", is generally described as a pleasant and good-natured bon vivant, if not very intelligent. General Heinz Guderian recalled Hewel as "a good raconteur and a good listener". Members of Hitler's inner circle recounted that, unlike many other Nazi leaders, Hewel was able to stay awake and attentive during Hitler's long monologues on topics such as anti-Semitism.  Martin Bormann, Hitler's private secretary, who actively worked to prevent his rivals from gaining access to the dictator, did not see Hewel as a threat, and encouraged their closeness, as Hewel was a calming influence. He usually ended up dealing with situations and events that Hitler could not handle. Hewel himself said that his role as the intermediary between Hitler and Ribbentrop called for "the tact of a mandarin and the footwork of an egg-dancer." When Ribbentrop called the Chancellery and asked to speak to Hewel, Hitler would often stand by him during the call and feed Hewel absurd things to tell the Foreign Minister, driving Ribbentrop into a tizzy.  

A waiter in Berlin described Hewel after the war in this way:

O'Donnell referred to Hewel as a man who had a front row seat to history, but who lacked the intelligence and perspective to realize it.

In popular culture
Walther Hewel has been portrayed by the following actors in film and television productions:

 John Savident in the 1973 British film Hitler: The Last Ten Days.
 Gerald Alexander Held in the 2004 German film Downfall (Der Untergang).

References
Notes

Bibliography
 
 Junge, Traudl; Müller, Melissa editor (2004) Until the Final Hour: Hitler's Last Secretary, Arcade Publishing. .
 
 

1904 births
1945 deaths
Nazis who participated in the Beer Hall Putsch
Nazi Party officials
German diplomats
People from Cologne
People from the Rhine Province
Technical University of Munich alumni
Nazis who committed suicide in Germany
Suicides by cyanide poisoning
Suicides by firearm in Germany
1945 suicides